Lucy Mulhall (born 29 September 1993) is an Irish rugby sevens player and captain of the Women's Irish rugby sevens team. She debut for the Ireland women's sevens team in 2015, and plays club rugby for Rathdrum. As of 23 January 2022, Mulhall has scored over 440 points for Ireland in the World Rugby Women's Sevens Series. Mulhall was studying science student at Trinity College Dublin and played Gaelic football for Wicklow prior to becoming a rugby sevens player.

References
Notes

Citations

External links
 
 Lucy Mulhall at Irish Rugby

1993 births
Living people
Ireland international women's rugby sevens players
Rugby union players from County Wicklow